Renato Nicolás Tarifeño Aranda (born September 6, 1996 in Coquimbo, Chile), nicknamed Tari, is a Chilean footballer who currently plays for Unión Bellavista.

Career

Honours
Coquimbo Unido
Primera B: 2014–C

References

External links
 Profile at BDFA 
 

1996 births
Living people
People from Coquimbo
Chilean footballers
Chilean Primera División players
Primera B de Chile players
Coquimbo Unido footballers
Universidad de Concepción footballers
Audax Italiano footballers
Club Deportivo Palestino footballers
Santiago Morning footballers
Association football forwards